Stadion Opačica is a football venue in Zelenika, Herceg Novi municipality, Montenegro. It is used for football matches and is the home ground of FK Orjen.

History
The stadium is built at Opačica location, Zelenika hood, during 1972.
Except Orjen home games, during the winter months, because of good climate and accommodation, the stadium is used for exhibition matches, tournaments, training and preparations of many football teams from the region (Montenegro, Serbia, Macedonia, Albania, Kosovo, Bosnia and Herzegovina and Croatia).

See also
FK Orjen
Herceg Novi

References

External links
 Stadium information

Football venues in Montenegro
Football in Montenegro